The Sad Sack is a 1957 comedy film based on the Harvey Comics character of the same title, created by George Baker. The film stars Jerry Lewis and Peter Lorre and was released by Paramount Pictures.

Plot
Private Meredith Bixby simply cannot fall in line with army procedure, even though he has had 17 months of training. A psychologist is assigned to turn him into a good soldier, so she enlists two fellow servicemen to help Bixby with his training. About the only thing that he can do right is remember things with his photographic memory.

Eventually they are assigned to a base in Morocco. One night they all head off to a bar where Bixby gets drunk on "Moroccan Delights", which he thinks are malteds. He gets involved with a femme fatale and is kidnapped by some Arabian renegades.

Abdul guards Bixby and makes him assemble a stolen cannon, knowing that Bixby had already memorized the assembly instructions back at the base. Bixby is eventually rescued by his fellow soldiers and they are all presented with medals of honor. Unfortunately, when Bixby mishandles a rifle that suddenly goes off, he damages the drinking glasses of the General and two visiting French officers. The trio (who are drinking a toast) are not hurt, but misfit Bixby gets punished with KP duty, peeling potatoes.

Cast
 Jerry Lewis as Pvt. Bixby
 Phyllis Kirk as Maj. Shelton
 Peter Lorre as Abdul
 Liliane Montevecchi as Zita
 David Wayne as Corp. Dolan
 Joe Mantell as Pvt. Wenaslavsky
 Gene Evans as Sgt. Pulley
 Shepperd Strudwick as Maj. Vanderlip
 Mary Treen as Sgt. Hansen

Production
The film is based upon George Baker's comic book character. Hal B. Wallis purchased the movie rights with the intention of the project starring the comedy team Martin and Lewis, but they split up before filming began. The Sad Sack was shot between March 18 and May 31, 1957 and released on November 27. It was re-released in 1962 as a double feature with another Jerry Lewis vehicle, The Delicate Delinquent, they being the first two films Lewis made without Dean Martin.

Reception
A Variety reviewer said that "the title, a hint of what the picture is about, and Jerry Lewis as star, communicate the message about this new Hal B. Wallis production. It’s the old army game, done over. But it’s fun. Not any imaginative explorations. Relying  on the type of zanyism with which Lewis is readily identified. Fun for those who go for it." Harold Whitehead of The Montreal Gazette said that "fans of his particular brand of comedy will undoubtedly have a fine time watching this film."

On the other hand, Bosley Crowther of The New York Times had this to say:

See also
 List of American films of 1957

References

External links 
 
 
 

1957 films
1957 comedy films
Films based on Harvey Comics
American comedy films
American black-and-white films
Films based on comic strips
Films based on American comics
Films directed by George Marshall
Films produced by Hal B. Wallis
Films scored by Walter Scharf
Military humor in film
Paramount Pictures films
1950s English-language films
1950s American films
English-language comedy films